Ludovico Geymonat (May 11, 1908 – November 29, 1991) was an Italian mathematician, philosopher and  historian of science. As a philosopher, he mainly dealt with philosophy of science, epistemology and Marxist philosophy, in which he gave an original turn to dialectical materialism.

Biography
Born in Turin, where Geymonat attended Liceo classico Cavour, he graduated in Philosophy in 1930 and in Mathematics in 1932. 
Geymonat tried to break the wall between science and philosophy that characterised the idealistic culture fostered by Fascist intellectuals like Giovanni Gentile. In 1934 he went to Vienna, to delve into the neo-positivist philosophy of the Vienna Circle.

During the World War II he fought as a partisan. After the war, he became communist assessor in Milan, between 1946 and 1949, when he obtained a chair of Theoretical philosophy at the University of Cagliari.
Then he taught as professor of History of philosophy at the University of Pavia between 1952 and 1956, and as professor of philosophy of science in the University of Milan from 1956 to 1979. 

Member of the Italian Communist Party (PCI), later he was a supporter of the Communist Refoundation Party founded when PCI turned into the Partito Democratico della Sinistra.

He died in Rho, Lombardy in 1991.

Notable students
Evandro Agazzi
Mario Capanna
Giulio Giorello
Mario Vegetti

Selected works
 Il problema della conoscenza nel positivismo, Bocca, Torino 1931
 La nuova filosofia della natura in Germania, Bocca, Torino 1934
 Studi per un nuovo razionalismo, Chiantore, Torino 1945
 Saggi di filosofia neorazionalistica, Einaudi, Torino 1953
 Galileo Galilei, Einaudi, Torino 1957, 
 Filosofia e filosofia della scienza, Feltrinelli, Milano 1960 
 Filosofia e pedagogia nella storia della civiltà, with Renato Tisato, Garzanti, Milano 1965, 3 voll. , 1965
 Attualità del materialismo dialettico, with Enrico Bellone, Giulio Giorello and Silvano Tagliagambe, Editori Riuniti, Roma 1974 
 Scienza e realismo, Feltrinelli, Milano 1977 
 Filosofia della probabilità, with Domenico Costantini, Feltrinelli, Milano 1982 ,
 Riflessioni critiche su Kuhn e Popper, Dedalo, Bari 1983 
 Lineamenti di filosofia della scienza, Mondadori, Milano 1985, new edition by Utet, Torino 2006 ,
 Le ragioni della scienza, with Giulio Giorello and Fabio Minazzi, Laterza, Roma-Bari 1986 ,
 Storia del pensiero filosofico e scientifico, Garzanti, Milano 1970-1976, 7 voll. ,
 La libertà, Rusconi, Milano 1988 
 La società come milizia, edited by Fabio Minazzi, Marcos y Marcos 1989 , new edition La civiltà come milizia, edited by Fabio Minazzi, La Città del Sole, Napoli 2008
 I sentimenti, Rusconi, Milano 1989 
 Filosofia, scienza e verità, with Evandro Agazzi and Fabio Minazzi, Rusconi, Milano 1989 ,
 La Vienna dei paradossi. Controversie filosofiche e scientifiche nel Wiener Kreis, edited by Mario Quaranta, il poligrafo, Padova 1991 
 Dialoghi sulla pace e la libertà, with Fabio Minazzi, Cuen, Napoli 1992
 La ragione, with Fabio Minazzi and Carlo Sini, Piemme, Casale Monferrato 1994

Bibliographic works on Ludovico Geymonat 
 Mario Quaranta (a cura di), Ludovico Geymonat filosofo della contraddizione, Sapere, Padova, 1980
 Corrado Mangione (a cura di), Scienza e filosofia. Saggi in onore di Ludovico Geymonat, Garzanti, Milano 1985
 Mirella Pasini, Daniele Rolando (a cura di), Il neoilluminismo italiano. Cronache di filosofia (1953-1962), Il Saggiatore, Milano 1991
 Fabio Minazzi, Scienza e filosofia in Italia negli anni Trenta: il contributo di Enrico Persico, Nicola Abbagnano e Ludovico Geymonat, in Il cono d'ombra. La crisi della cultura agli inizi del '900, Fabio Minazzi (edited by), Marcos y Marcos, Milano 1991, pp. 117–184
 Norberto Bobbio, Ricordo di Ludovico Geymonat, "Rivista di Filosofia", LXXXIV, 1, 1993
 Silvio Paolini Merlo, Consuntivo storico e filosofico sul "Centro di Studi Metodologici" di Torino (1940-1979), Pantograf (Cnr), Genova 1998
 Fabio Minazzi, La passione della ragione. Studi sul pensiero di Ludovico Geymonat, Thélema Edizioni-Accademia di architettura, Università della Svizzera italiana, Milano-Mendrisio 2001
 Mario Quaranta, Ludovico Geymonat. Una ragione inquieta, Seam, Formello 2001
 Fabio Minazzi (edited by), Filosofia, scienza e vita civile nel pensiero di Ludovico Geymonat, La Città del Sole, Napoli 2003
 Fabio Minazzi, Contestare e creare. La lezione epistemologico-civile di Ludovico Geymonat, La Città del Sole, Napoli 2004
 Silvio Paolini Merlo, Nuove prospettive sul "Centro di Studi Metodologici" di Torino, in «Bollettino della Società Filosofica Italiana», n. 182, maggio/agosto 2004
 Fabio Minazzi (a cura di), Ludovico Geymonat, un Maestro del Novecento. Il filosofo, il partigiano e il docente, Edizioni Unicopli, Milano 2009
 Pietro Rossi, Avventure e disavventure della filosofia. Saggi sul pensiero italiano del Novecento, il Mulino, Bologna, 2009
 Bruno Maiorca (a cura di), Ludovico Geymonat. Scritti sardi. Saggi, articoli e interviste, CUEC, Cagliari, 2008
 Fabio Minazzi, Ludovico Geymonat epistemologo, Mimesis Edizioni, Milano 2010

1908 births
1991 deaths
Writers from Turin
Marxist theorists
20th-century Italian philosophers
Italian Communist Party politicians
20th-century Italian politicians
Italian newspaper editors
Italian male journalists
Italian philosophers
Politicians from Turin